Denis Yuryevich Kiselyov (born 2 June 1978) is a Russian professional football coach and a former player.

External links
 

1978 births
People from Zelenograd
Footballers from Moscow
Living people
Russian footballers
Association football forwards
FC Dynamo Moscow reserves players
FC Tom Tomsk players
FC Khimki players
Russian Premier League players
FC Volgar Astrakhan players
FC Salyut Belgorod players
FC Mostransgaz Gazoprovod players
FC Olimp-Dolgoprudny players